The 2014 NA LCS season was the second year of the North American League of Legends Championship Series. It was divided into spring and summer splits, each consisting of a regular season and playoff stage. The top six teams from the regular season advanced to the playoff stage, with the top two teams receiving a bye to the semifinals. Regular season games were played in Riot Games' studio in Sawtelle, Los Angeles.

The spring split began on January 16 and concluded on April 20 with the spring finals, which Cloud9 won with the same roster from the previous split: Balls, Meteos, Hai, Sneaky and LemonNation.

The summer split began on May 23 and concluded with Team SoloMid winning their second NA LCS title on September 1, with a roster consisting of Dyrus, Amazing, Bjergsen, WildTurtle and Lustboy. The summer split also saw the introduction of Riot Games' official fantasy league, the Fantasy LCS.

Team SoloMid, Cloud9 and LMQ qualified for the 2014 World Championship by placing first, second and third respectively in the summer playoffs.

Spring

Regular season

Playoffs

Summer

Regular season

Playoffs

References 

League of Legends Championship Series seasons
North American League of Legends Championship
North American League of Legends Championship
North American League of Legends Championship